This is a list of American television-related events in 1946.

Events

Television programs

Debuts

Births

Deaths

References

External links 
List of 1946 American television series at IMDb